Ludmila Yurina (born 16 January 1962) is a Ukrainian composer,pianist and musicologist.

Biography
Ludmila Yurina was born in Uzyn, Ukraine, and graduated from Kyiv Music College as a pianist in 1981 and from Kyiv State P.I.Tchaikovsky Conservatoire as a composer in 1990, completing her post-graduate studies there in 1998. She was a Visiting Scholar at the CCRMA, Stanford University  in 2011.

She attended workshops with eminent musicians P-H. Dittrich, Irvine Arditti, H. Zapf, G. Stäbler, J. Durand at the  Rheinsberg Music Academy as well as with Helmut Lachenmann and Wolfgang Rihm in Dresden.

In 1990–92, she was the Music Director of the theatre studios Kolo and ARS in Kiev. Since 1993, she has been a member and a coordinator of the Organizing Committee of the International Youth Music Forum in Kiev. In 1997 she was the Artistic Director of the Meta-Art Ukrainian Contemporary Art Festival in Kyiv.

Since 1995, Ludmila Yurina has worked as Associate Professor of Department of composition at the National Music Academy of Ukraine specialising in composition,orchestration, symphony scores reading ( plus two courses). She was a guest-composer to flute master-course at the Rheinsberg Music Academy in 1999, was invited to give a lecture about contemporary Ukrainian music there in 1999, Staatliche Hochschule für Musik und Darstellende Kunst in Stuttgart in 2006, to Texas Christian University in 2008 and 2011,to City University New-York Graduate Center aka CUNY Graduate Center in 2020 and to the Stanford University ( CCRMA, 2022) .
 
Yurina's creative residences:
 Künstlerhof Schreyahn( Germany, 1998); 
 Experimental Electronic Music Studio of Südwestrundfunk (Heinrich-Strobel-Stiftung, Freiburg, Germany, 1999);
 Visby International Centre for composers (or VICC) (Gotland, Sweden, 2005, 2006).

In 2010 she got a grant from the Fulbright Foundation for scholarship in Stanford University, CCRMA (USA).

In 1999 her name was included in the reference book Who Is Who (Delaware, USA).

Yurina participated in numerous international festivals; her works have been performed in Ukraine, Germany, France, USA, Canada, Italy, Finland, Estonia,Israel, Moldova, Mongolia, Poland, etc. She has collaborated with such well-known German performers as cellist M. Lorenz, trombonist Dirk Amrein, pianist S.Eder,  C. Levine, Sinfonietta Dresden, New music ensemble XelmYa, Ensemble Timbre Actuel. Her music also have been performed by MAVerick ensemble, Symphony orchestra of Northwestern University, Karen Bentley Pollick, Trio Ravus, Edo Frenkel, Laura Ospina (US), Borealis Brass (Canada), Pierre-Stephane Meuge (France), Ivo Nilsson (Sweden), Orchestra of Ukrainian Television and Broadcasting company, National Symphony Orchestra of Ukraine, Kyiv Camerata,the percussion ensemble ARS NOVA, TanzLaboratorium Dance Company, Duo Violoncelissimo, the new-music ensemble Sed Contra, pianist Eugene Gromov (Ukraine).

Recordings of her music were produced on the CD Two Days and Two Nights of New Music: Festivals 1998–2000 and by Radio Deutsche Welle (Germany), Ukrainian Independent Radio (Chicago, USA), WPRB (Princeton, USA), Canadian broadcasting (Edmonton) and the Ukrainian National TV and Radio Company. Her works are published by Muzychna Ukrajina Publishing House (Ukraine), Frederic Harris Music Publishing (Canada), Furore Verlag, Certosa Verlag (Germany), TEM Taukay Edition (Italy), Terem-music Verlag (Switzerland) and Donemus (Netherlands) .

Ludmila Yurina is an organiser and co-director of the three festivals of contemporary Ukrainian music in USA - Fort-Worth- 2008, 2012 and of Ukrainian contemporary music festival in New-York-2020 [https://centerforthehumanities.org/programming/ukrainian-contemporary-music-festival-new-york-2020). She is a member of the National Ukrainian Composers’ Union .

Awards and grants
 Torneo Internationale di Musica- TIM competition( Italy, 1999)
 Baden-Württemberg Ministry of Research, Science and Art`grant (Baden-Baden, Germany, 2001);
 Lyatoshynsky Award ( Ukraine's Ministry of Culture, 2008)
 Kosenko Award ( Ukraine's Ministry of Culture, 2014) 
 Lysenko Award ( Ukraine's Ministry of Culture, 2016)
 Swedish Institute`grants (2005, 2006)
 Fulbright Foundation grant (2010)

Compositions
2022
”DUMA” for Violin: 6’
”Distant lands” for Violin and electronic: 6’
2016 
”Geflimmer", trio for Oboe, Clarinet and Bassoon: 6'(2014/16)
”In Good Mood", Piano album for children (2016)
2015 
 “Caricature”miniature for chamber ensemble  :1`10
”Silicon Interferences” for flute,clarinet,piano,violin and violoncello : 7'

2014/15
”Lady Lazarus”, monoopera for soprano and piano on texts S.Plath, J.Joyce and R.Bach : 25'
                ”Archipelago”(dedicated to John Chowning) for piano and live-electronic : 8'
                ”Drift” (dedicated to Jon Appleton) for string orchestra, piano and percussions : 8' 
2012 
”Trombon(o)per(a)Dirk”for solo trombone : 7'
2010
 ”Bird Bennu' Songs” for flute, clarinet, violin and violoncello  : 9'
2008
”EXISTENZA…” for dancers,electronic and video : 29'
 “Hunting for Brother”, music for radio-drama, text by V. Lyss : 10'
2007
 “Perseus-Betha-Algol” for e-guitar with processor and electronic : 8' 40
 “Pulsar” for violin  : 8'
2005
 “Initiation”, cantata for baritone, mixed choir, and orchestra : 19' 30
  “Crystal” for symphony orchestra :9'
2004 
”Visions of St. John Baptist” for string quartet : 8'
 “Angel of White Day”for Piano  : 5'
2003\04 
”That one, who entered into the circle” for symphony orchestra : 9'
2002 
”Shadows of deep sleeping” for flute, oboe, piano, and cello : 11`20
2001 
”Topos Uranios” for Harpsichord and live electronics: 8'
 “Kashmir”, version of "Led Zeppelin"'s song for symphony orchestra and rock instruments: 5'
 “Waterdreams” for Trombono, percussion, improvising Saxophono,video and pantomime: 11'
2000
”Irrlicht” for solo violoncello: 6'
”Klangillusion” for flute, piano, and violoncello: 8'
1999
”Quad”, electronic music to S. Becket's piece: 16'
”Shadows and Ghosts” for piano: 5'
 “Gemma” for solo flute: 6'
1998 
”Funny Death”on A. Ginsberg's text for soprano, 2 microphones, and tam-tam: 5'
”Funny Death” on A. Ginsberg's text for 2 sopranos, 2 altos, 2 tenors, 2 baritones: 4'
”Glass-Elegy” for piano: 8'
“Xing” for trombone, percussion, piano, and contrabass: 10'
1997
”Streams”, film music: 8'
 “As soon as possible…” ("Jaknajskorish…") for solo oboe: 6'
 “…end-les…” for symphony orchestra: 8'
1996
 “Ein kleiner Marsch mit grossem Wecker” for children's percussion ensemble: 6'
 “Distanzierung” for 2 violoncellos: 8'
1995 
Signore Beresciolo, chamber symphony (restoration and edition) for 2 oboes, chamber orchestra
”Ritornelli” (dedicated to Valentin Silvestrov) for Piano: 5'
”The End of the Game or Provocations” for clarinet, piano, violin, and violoncello: 7'
1993
 “Geometricum”for flute, oboe, clarinet, bassoon, and horn : 14'
 “Ekagrata” for four groups of percussion: 15'
”Ran-Nan” for 19 strings: 11'
1992
”The Garden of the Shadows” , film music: 12'
”Disintegrations” for solo trombone: 8'
1991
”Rao Noala” for soprano, flute, vibraphone, piano, and violin: 11'
 1987—1991 “Jazz Fiesta”, children's piano album: 30'
1989
 Concerto for solo trombone and symphony orchestra 17'
1987
”Two Jazz Etudes for Children” for piano: 2'
 1984—1987 “Ukrainian Echo”, five pieces for piano: 6'
1985
 “Town and Country”, three pieces for piano: 5'

Articles
"Like Ulysses...", magazine Art-Line No. 9, 1996, Kyiv, Ukraine ;
"Ukrainian women-composers in the world context" , Scientific news (National music Academy of Ukraine), issue 75, Kyiv, 2009 ;
"About some problems of improvisation in music of Hans-Joachim Hespos" ,Kyiv musicology,issue 30, Kyiv R.Glyer's music Institute, pages 184–189, Kyiv 2009 http://glierinstitute.org/ukr/digests/030/21.pdf
"'Гелікоптер-квартет' К. Штокгаузена: особливості концепції і виконання" ("Helicopter-String Quartet" by K. Stockhausen: features of conception and performance), Ukrainian musicology no. 42, NMAU 2016. archive from 13 July 2019 of original
"About textural features of Helmut Lachenmann`s "Trio Fluido", Lviv, annual science issue #30,pages 129–133, 2013 ISSN 2310-0583
"Modern Ukrainian Music:  1980–2000" – Ex Tempore magazine, USA, 2008    http://www.ex-tempore.org/yurina.htm
"Stepping by planet CCRMA" (in Ukrainian) http://mus.art.co.ua/krokuyuchy-planetoyu-karma/
 "Ukrainian-German intersections: the aesthetics of Mauricio Kagel as an impulse for Serhii Zazhytko’s creative experiments",Kyiv musicology annual issue, #59,2019, pages 100-111, https://kyivmusicology.com/index.php/journal/article/view/100

Notes

References
Gabel, Gerald. 2008. "Fourteen Composers in Today's Ukraine". Ex Tempore 14, no. 1 (Spring-Summer): 57–107, TCU, Texas, USA
О.Кизлова .Людмила ЮРИНА: «В Украине все новое требует неимоверных усилий»                                                                          https://day.kyiv.ua/article/kultura/lyudmyla-yurina-v-ukrayini-vse-nove-vymahaye-neymovirnykh-zusyl
О.Берегова.Камерна музика українських композиторів у контексті художньо-стильових процесів 1990–2000 рр.  (O.Beregova.Chamber music by Ukrainian composers in the context of artistic and stylistic processes of 1990–2000 yy.) http://knmau.com.ua/naukoviy_visnik/106/pdf/20.pdf
О.Гуркова."Внутрішне світло музики Людмили Юріної" (O.Gurkova."Inner light of Ludmila Yurina`s music") http://mus.art.co.ua/vnutrishnje-svitlo-muzyky-lyudmyly-yurinoji/
Inna Ivanova."FUNNY DEATH" of Ludmila Yurina and "SALVE REGINA" of Maxim Shalygin:technique of work of the composer with a verbal series" ,"Music science on beginning of third century" ,Odessa Nezhdanova's music Academy, 2019, issue No. 8 http://onmavisnyk.com.ua/uploads/editor/stud_issue/stid_8/2bcc60407da2b5b360dac521756a3594.pdf
O.Berehova. Metamorphosis of meanings in world literature in the works of Ukrainian composer Ludmila Yurina,"Interpretacje dziela muzycznego Narodowosc i wartosci uniwersalne" (4), Bydgoszcz 2019, Poland

External links
http://www.youtube.com/user/monodia
https://soundcloud.com/ludmilayurina 
https://ccrma.stanford.edu/people/liudmyla-iurina
https://music.apple.com/us/artist/ludmila-yurina/466043153
https://open.spotify.com/artist/5PrqvcOB6XHcPAg1JS1Rfg/discography?
https://yurina.ru.gg 
https://webshop.donemus.com/action/front/composer/Yurina%2C+Ludmila
http://new.terem-music.ch/index.php?route=product/manufacturer/info&manufacturer_id=48
https://stanforddaily.com/2022/11/02/through-invasion-and-revolution-ludmila-yurina-on-ukrainian-music-history/?fbclid=IwAR0CAi61oUIXmXU1o9jo5wGCwxsd7ShQaM15gprAvsfItCh7l_K0qg5xHtY
http://www.northwestern.edu/newscenter/stories/2010/11/kyiv-ukraine-music-festival.html

1962 births
Living people
Ukrainian composers